Lawton Chiles High School is a public high school located on US 319 in unincorporated Leon County, Florida, United States, north of Tallahassee. It is a part of the Leon County school district.

History 
Lawton Chiles High School was established in 1999 and is the newest public high school in the district. The first graduating class was the class of 2002. The school is named in honor of Lawton Chiles, governor of Florida from 1991 to 1998. Chiles is also known for hosting a math competition for grades 4 through 9, called the "Mini Mu" and is similar to Mu Alpha Theta competitions.

The school motto, "Cognosco, Duco, Perficio" translates from Latin to "I learn, I lead, I achieve."

Student life

Academic activities

Advanced Placement programs

 Art History
 Biology
 Calculus AB
 Calculus BC
 Chemistry
 Computer Science A
 Computer Science Principles
 English Language and Composition
 English Literature and Composition
 Environmental Science
 European History
 French Language and Culture
 Human Geography
 Latin
 Macroeconomics
 Music Theory
 Physics 1: Algebra-Based
 Physics 2: Algebra-Based
 Physics C: Electricity and Magnetism
 Physics C: Mechanics
 Psychology
 Spanish Language and Culture
 Spanish Literature and Culture
 Statistics
 Studio Art: 2-D Design
 Studio Art: 3-D Design
 Studio Art: Drawing
 United States Government and Politics
 United States History
 World History

Co-curricular activities 

 Band
 Chorus
 Corner Cafe
 Drama
 Externship
 Fine art
 Newspaper
 Orchestra
 Web Design
Mu Alpha Theta
 WolfCenter Studios
 Yearbook

Athletics 

Although the school prides itself more on academic and other achievements, much support has been given to Chiles High School athletics, which offers the following sports:

 Baseball
 Basketball (boys' and girls')
 Cheerleading - 2017 Division 1A Large State Runner-Up, 2021 Division 1A Small State Runner-Up. Region 1 Champions in 2018, 2019, & 2021
 Cross country - Division 3A State Champions in 2003, 2005, 2006, and 2014 
 Girls' cross country - three-peat Division 3A state champions in 2008, 2009, and 2010; Division 3A champions in 2015, 2017, 2018
 Dance
 Flag football
 Football
 Golf (boys' and girls')
 Lacrosse (boys')
 Soccer (boys' and girls') - 2015 Division 4A Boys State Champions 
 Softball
 Special Olympics - through the ESE program, Chiles offers basketball for students with physical or mental disabilities
 Swimming - girls' swimming team 2010 State Champions: boys' swimming team 2016 and 2017 State Champions 
 Tennis - Girl's Class 3A State Runner-Up 2017
 Track and Field - Division 3A State Champions in 2003, 2014, 2015, and 2016 
 Volleyball
 Weightlifting (boys' and girls')
 Wrestling

References

External links 
Lawton Chiles High School website

 http://chilesathletics.com/swimming

Educational institutions established in 1999
High schools in Leon County, Florida
Schools in Tallahassee, Florida
Public high schools in Florida
1999 establishments in Florida